Kurt Farquhar is a Los Angeles-based television and film composer. Farquhar is a seven-time BMI award winner, including four for The King of Queens. one for The Game and two for Being Mary Jane.  He is best known for composing the scores for The King of Queens, Girlfriends, Sister, Sister, Moesha, Being Mary Jane, The Game, Black Lightning, The Neighborhood, and Real Husbands of Hollywood. Farquhar's career is notable for having scored more prime-time television series than any other African-American composer to date.

A native of Chicago, he is the youngest of five children. He is the younger brother of television producer and writer Ralph Farquhar, and the two have worked together on several shows.

Farquhar musical education took him from the streets of Chicago to the famed Berklee College of Music in Boston, The National Conservatory of Music in Versailles, France, and Eastern Illinois University, where he studied with noted percussion teacher Johnny Lane. By the age of 12, Farquhar had already written his first symphonic work. During his early 20s, Farquhar performed with various jazz artists most notably Grammy Award-winning trumpet player Freddie Hubbard.

In his late twenties, Farquhar was the lead singer of the band Big Slamm. They released their first single, "Livin' Large," on Modern Records. This song went on to become the end title for the pilot episode of Livin' Large, produced by Stephen J. Cannell. Farquhar went on to create theme songs and scores for a multitude of television shows and feature films.

Farquhar is also the founder and CEO of True Music, a prominent music licensing catalog operating out of Pasadena, California, which has licensed music throughout broadcast and cable television as well as feature films.

Works

Television

Film

Recordings
Real Life (composer) - The Pointer Sisters
Stupid Love (arranger) - Brenda Russell
Crazy For Your Love (composer) - Sam Riney
Now That I'm With You (composer) - Papa John Creach 
Everytime We Kiss (composer) - Sam Riney

|}

References

External links
Official website
True Music website

Year of birth missing (living people)
African-American film score composers
American film score composers
Living people
Male film score composers
Place of birth missing (living people)
21st-century African-American people